The Diamond Museum Amsterdam is a museum located at the Museumplein in Amsterdam, Netherlands. The museum was founded in 2007 by Ben Meier of Coster Diamonds. The permanent collection consists of diamond jewelry and gives background information about diamonds.

The museum is a member of the Dutch Museum Association and the Official Museums of Amsterdam.

References

External links 
 
 Diamond Museum Amsterdam

Diamond museums
Museums in Amsterdam
Jewellery museums
Amsterdam-Zuid